Daniele Pantano (born February 10, 1976) is a poet, essayist, literary translator, artist, editor, and scholar.  He was born in Langenthal, Switzerland, of Sicilian and German parentage. Pantano holds degrees in philosophy, literature, and creative writing. His poems have been translated into several languages, including Albanian, Arabic, Bulgarian, French, German, Italian, Kurdish, Slovenian, Persian, Russian, and Spanish. He is the former American editor of Härter, a prominent German literary magazine; co-editor of em: a review of text and image; publisher/faculty advisor of the Black Market Review; translations editor of The Adirondack Review, and editor of Saw Palm: Florida Literature and Art, Poems Niederngasse, and The M.A.G. Pantano curates The Abandoned Playground, TAP Editions, and is founding Director of the Refugee Poetry Project and Co-Director of the International Refugee Poetry Network. Pantano divides his time between Switzerland, the United States, and England. He has taught at the University of South Florida, where he also served as Director of the Writing Center, and, as visiting poet-in-residence, at Florida Southern College. In 2008, he joined the staff of Edge Hill University, England, as Senior Lecturer in Creative Writing and Programme Leader of the BA Creative Writing. In 2012, he was promoted to Reader in Poetry and Literary Translation. Pantano currently teaches at the University of Lincoln, where he is Associate Professor (Reader) in Creative Writing and Programme Leader for the MA Creative Writing.

Visual Art and Installations
Pantano's visual art and installations have been exhibited nationally and internationally, including the Kunsthalle Kohta, Finland; University of Birmingham; Royal Holloway, University of London; Kingston University; Dumfries & Galloway Arts Festival, Scotland; The Design Centre, John Moores University, Liverpool; and the etk art space, Switzerland.

Music and Noise Poems 
 Poem Pot Plays Pantano (Dalia Donadio/Wide Ear Records, Zurich, Switzerland, 2020)
 Errata Vol. 1 (tkbks, Bern, Switzerland, 2020)
 Errata Vol. 2 (tkbks, Bern, Switzerland, 2021)
 Ballerinas (Dalia Donadio/Martin Perret/Wide Ear Records, Flargrant Délit, Zurich, Switzerland, 2021)
 Errata Vol. 3 (tkbks, Bern, Switzerland, 2022)
 Errata Vol. 4 (tkbks, Bern, Switzerland, 2022)

Publications
Pantano's individual works, as well as his translations from the German by Friedrich Dürrenmatt, Georg Trakl, and Robert Walser, have been featured or are forthcoming in numerous journals and anthologies in Europe, Asia, and the United States, including Absinthe: New European Writing, The Adirondack Review, ARCH, The Baltimore Review, Bayou Magazine, The Book Of Hopes And Dreams (Bluechrome 2006), Conjunctions,The Cortland Review, Evergreen Review, Dreginald, Das Magazin, Gradiva: International Journal of Italian Poetry, Guernica, Harper's Magazine, Hotel, Italian Americana, la revue de belles-lettres, Jacket, Lilliput Review, The Mailer Review, Mayday Magazine, Modern Poetry in Translation, The Pedestal Magazine, Plume, Poetenladen, Poetry International, 32 Poems Magazine, Poetic Voices Without Borders 1&2 (Gival Press 2005, 2009), Poetry Salzburg Review, Poetry London, Style: A Quarterly Journal of Aesthetics, Poetics, and Stylistics, The Toronto Quarterly, Versal, Verse Daily, VLAK, The White Whale Review, 3:am Magazine, and The Wolf.

Books
 Blumendürre––Visionen einer Reise (Private Publication––Frankfurt, Germany, 1996)
 Geschlüpfte Kreaturen (Private Publication—Frankfurt, Germany, 1997)
 Blue Opium (Carlyle Press, 1997)
 Camera Obscura (Carlyle Press, 1999)
 Panta Rhei (Alpha Beat Press, 2000)
 Blue Opium, Panta Rhei, and Camera Obscura (Infinity Press, 2001)
 The Oldest Hands in the World (Black Lawrence Press/Dzanc Books, New York, 2010)
 Mass Graves (XIX-XXII) (The Knives, Forks and Spoons Press, 2011)
 Mass Graves: City of Now (The Knives, Forks and Spoons Press, 2012)
 Dogs in Untended Fields (Zurich, Switzerland: Wolfbach Verlag, 2015)
 Waldeinsamkeit: Liverpool Poems (Chapter VI) (Argotist Books, 2016)
 ORAKL (Black Lawrence Press, New York, 2017)
 Waldeinsamkeit (13) (zimZalla, Manchester, 2018)
 Kindertotenlieder: Collected Early Essay & Letters & Confessions (Bristol: Hesterglock Press, 2019)
 Six Essays (Bern, Switzerland: aaaa press, 2020)
 Sinner (Langenthal, Switzerland: TAP Editions, 2021)
 Ten Million and One Silences (Bern, Switzerland: edition taberna kritika, 2021)
 333 (etkcontext, Bern, Switzerland, 2022)
 Himmel-Bimmel-Bam-Bam (edition taberna kritika, Bern, Switzerland, 2022)
 Home for Difficult Children (Broken Sleep Books, Talgarreg, UK, 2022)
 Order & Necessity (Bern, Switzerland: edition taberna kritika, 2023)

Translations
 In an Abandoned Room: Selected Poems by Georg Trakl (Erbacce Press, Liverpool, 2008)
 The Possible Is Monstrous: Selected Poems by Friedrich Dürrenmatt (Black Lawrence Press/Dzanc Books, New York, 2010)
 Oppressive Light: Selected Poems by Robert Walser (Black Lawrence Press, New York, 2012)
 Robert Walser: Fairy Tales--Dramolettes (New Directions, New York, 2015)
 Robert Walser: Comedies (Seagull Books, London, 2017)
 Michael Fehr: super light (Der gesunde Menschenversand, Luzern, 2020)
 Friedrich Dürrenmatt's The Virus Epidemic in South Africa (Centre Dürrenmatt, Neuchatel, Switzerland, 2022)
 Robert Walser: The Poems (Seagull Books, London, 2022)

Forthcoming

 The Damned: Selected Poems by Georg Trakl (Broken Sleep Books, Talgarreg, UK, 2023)
 Georg Trakl: The Collected Works (Black Lawrence Press, New York, 2024)

Translations of Pantano

Persian: The Oldest Hands in the World, 2013 (original The Oldest Hands in the World), translated by Sahar Tavakoli, Dastan Publishing House, Tehran, Iran.
Kurdish: The Oldest Hands in the World, 2013 (original The Oldest Hands in the World), translated by Faryad Shiri, Dastan Publishing House, Tehran, Iran.
German: Dogs in Untended Fields / Hunde in verwahrlosten Feldern (Selected Poems), 2015, translated by Jürgen Brôcan, Wolfbach Verlag, Zurich, Switzerland.
Spanish: 14 Poem(a)s, Selected Poems by Daniele Pantano, 2019, translated by Pablo Ascierto and Tomás Sufotinsky, Ediciones Abend, Rosario, Santa Fe, Argentina.
Persian: Mass Graves: Study in Soot & Hypertonic Saline (Selected Poems), 2019, translated by Sahar Tavakoli, Dastan Publishing House, Tehran, Iran.
Kurdish: Mass Graves: Study in Soot & Hypertonic Saline (Selected Poems), 2019, translated by Faryad Shiri, Dastan Publishing House, Tehran, Iran.
Italian: Dogs (Selected Poems), 2020, translated by Alessandra Ceccoli, Jona Editore, Turin, Italy.
French: Dogs in Untended Fields / Chiens dans des champs en friche (Selected Poems), 2020, translated by Eva Anntonikov, Éditions d'en bas, Lausanne, Switzerland.
Persian: Home for Difficult Children, 2023, translated by Sahar Tavakoli, Dastan Publishing House, Tehran, Iran.

References
 www.pantano.ch. . Retrieved December 4, 2020.

External links
 Official Site www.pantano.ch
 Two poems at Plume
 Three poems at Evergreen Review
 Seven poems in English, and German translation by Jürgen Brôcan, at Poetenladen
 Four poems at 3:am Magazine
 Pantano at Verse Daily
 Pantano at Great Works Magazine
 Pantano at Jacket Magazine
 Robert Walser translation at Guernica
 Three poems, one translation, and readings at The Cortland Review
 Three poems at Poet's Corner––Fieralingue
 Three poems at The Other Voices International Project
 Newspaper article: "When Switzerland Closed Its Doors, America Welcomed Pantano"
 Interview at 3:am Magazine
 Interview at Hotel Magazine
 Newspaper article: "Two Poets Laureate Appear in Polk" Billy Collins / Daniele Pantano
 Two translations at ARCH, Washington University
 Three poems at The White Whale Review

See also
 List of Swiss Poets
 List of Swiss People
 List of Poets
 List of Translators

1976 births
Living people
People from Oberaargau District
Swiss male poets
Swiss academics
University of South Florida alumni
German–English translators
Academics of Edge Hill University
Academics of the University of Lincoln
People from Langenthal